Thank You is a 1925 American comedy film directed by John Ford. This film is based on a 1921 Broadway play, Thank You, by Winchell Smith and Tom Cushing.

Plot
As described in a film magazine review, a millionaire banishes his wild son to a chicken farm near a small, slow town. Excitement comes with the arrival from Paris of the local minister’s daughter, for whom the Parisian modistes have done their utmost. She and the young man hit it off too well to please the village gossips, but the gossips lose on every point.

Cast

 Alec B. Francis as David Lee
 Jacqueline Logan as Diane Lee
 George O'Brien as Kenneth Jamieson
 J. Farrell MacDonald as Andy
 George Fawcett as Cornelius Jamieson
 Cyril Chadwick as Mr. Jones
 Edith Bostwick as Mrs. Jones
 Marion Harlan as Milly Jones
 Vivia Ogden as Miss Blodgett
 James Neill as Doctor Cobb
 Billy Rinaldi as Sweet, Jr.
 Aileen Manning as Hannah
 Maurice Murphy as Willie Jones
 Robert Milasch as Sweet, Sr.
 Ida Moore as Gossiping Woman
 Frankie Bailey as Gossiping Man
 William Courtright (uncredited)
 Richard Cummings (uncredited)
 Tommy Hicks as Fat kid (uncredited)
 Francis Powers as Gossiping Man (uncredited)

Preservation
Thank You is considered to be a lost film.

See also
List of lost films

References

External links

1925 films
1925 comedy films
1925 lost films
Silent American comedy films
American silent feature films
American black-and-white films
Films directed by John Ford
Fox Film films
Films with screenplays by Frances Marion
Lost American films
Lost comedy films
1920s American films